Krstac may refer to:
Krstač, an ancient variety of grape
Krstac (mountain), a mountain in Serbia
Krstac (Čajniče), a village in Bosnia and Herzegovina
Krstac, Jablanica, a village in Bosnia and Herzegovina
Krstac (Lučani), a village in Serbia
Krstac (Sjenica), a village in Serbia